Cat Island may refer to:

Places
 Cat Island (Rodrigues), Mauritius
 Cat Island (Tasmania), Australia
 Cat Island (Antarctica)
 Tashirojima, Japan, also known as Cat Island due to a high population of cats
 Aoshima, Ehime, Japan, also known as Cat Island due to a high population of cats

North America
 Cat Island, Bahamas, Bahamas
 Cat Island (Massachusetts), United States
 Cat Island (Mississippi), United States
 Cat Island (South Carolina), one of the Sea Islands in Beaufort County, South Carolina, United States
 Cat Island (Wisconsin), United States
 Cat Island National Wildlife Refuge, Louisiana, United States

Novels
 Cat Island (novel), a 1981 science fiction novel by Walter Jon Williams

See also
 Cát Bà Island, Vietnam